Heidelberg is an unincorporated community in Lee County, Kentucky, United States.  It lies along Route 399 southwest of the city of Beattyville, the county seat of Lee County.  Its elevation is 718 feet (219 m), and it is located at  (37.5553639|-83.7788073).  It has a post office with the ZIP code 41333. (This Post office is Currently no longer in service and is instead being used as someone's housing.) Said post office was established in 1904, and is said to be named for the hometown of an early German-American settler. Heidelberg is also home to the modern Native American enthusiast and skilled craftsmen Marcus Abner.

Climate
The climate in this area is characterized by hot, humid summers and generally mild to cool winters.  According to the Köppen Climate Classification system, Heidelberg has a humid subtropical climate, abbreviated "Cfa" on climate maps.

References

Unincorporated communities in Lee County, Kentucky
Unincorporated communities in Kentucky